The Disease Outbreak Response System Condition (DORSCON) is a disease crisis management plan in Singapore. The system is colour-coded reflecting the disease situation in Singapore. Beside showing the disease situation, it also outline the impact on the general public and what the general public should do.

History 
In 2003, after the SARS outbreak in Singapore, the Ministry of Health created the National Influenza Pandemic Preparedness and Response Plan which included DORSCON. DORSCON was first used during the 2009 swine flu pandemic in Singapore. The plan was further updated after the swine flu pandemic is over.

In 2013, then-Health Minister Gan Kim Yong announced a revised DORSCON framework. The framework now considers disease severity in addition to the spread of diseases in Singapore, thereby indicating the overall public health impact in Singapore. In addition to that, control measures are no longer hard-wired to each phase but are modular for MOH's continually assessment of the risks, hence making the framework more flexible with four colour alerts instead of five. This allows the framework to be used for both mild and severe diseases.

DORSCON levels

Status change 
28 April 2009, Raised from Green to Yellow.
30 April 2009: Raised from Yellow to Orange.
11 May 2009: Reduced from Orange to Yellow.
12 February 2010: Reduced from Yellow to Green.
22 January 2020: Raised from Green to Yellow.
7 February 2020: Raised from Yellow to Orange.
26 April 2022: Reduced from Orange to Yellow.
13 February 2023: Reduced from Yellow to Green.

References 

Healthcare in Singapore